Percy Alan Jones (20 January 1908 – 14 March 1960) was an  Australian rules footballer who played with Geelong in the Victorian Football League (VFL).

Originally from Wangaratta, Jones played in Wangaratta's 1925 Ovens & Murray Football League premiership under coach, Percy Rowe.

Jones crossed to the Hume Weir Football Club in 1926 (most likely for work during the construction of the Hume Weir), then was recruited to Geelong via Hume Weir Football Club in the Ovens & Murray Football League, after kicking 104 goals in 1928

Jones commenced training with Geelong in March, 1929 and made his senior VFL debut in June, 1929, in round eight, against Hawthorn, kicking two goals, then played again in round nine, against South Melbourne, kicking 1 goal.

Jones kicked four goals in Weir United's 1931 Ovens & Murray Football League grand final win against West Albury.

Jones kicked four goals for Border United FC (Albury) in their 1933 Ovens & Murray Football League one point grand final loss to Wangaratta, after earlier kicking 11 goals against Rutherglen in round nine. Jones finished with 60 goals in 1933.

Family
The son of Rowland Herbert Jones, and Maud Lucy Jones, née Vincent, Percy Alan Jones was born at Wangaratta, Victoria on 20 January 1908.

Notes

External links 

1928 - O&MFL Premiers: Hume Weir FC team photo
1931 - O&MFL Premiers: Weir United FC team photo 
1933 - O&MFL Border United FC & Wangaratta FC team photos
Percy A Jones' World War Two service records Department of Veteran's Affairs.

1908 births
1960 deaths
Australian rules footballers from Victoria (Australia)
Geelong Football Club players
People from Wangaratta